Charleston is a given name and a surname.

Given name
Charleston Rambo, American gridiron football player
Charleston Hughes (born 1983), American gridiron football player

Surname

Allan Charleston (1934 – 2015), Australian water polo player
Anne Charleston (born 1942), Australian-born actress
Aub Charleston (1901 – 1985), Australian rules footballer
Bennie Charleston (1907 – 1988), American Negro league baseball player
Craig Charleston (born 1970), Scottish football referee
David Charleston (1848 – 1934), Cornish-born Australian politician
Elizabeth Charleston (1819-1997), American painter
Fernando Charleston Hernández (born 1976), Mexican politician
Jeff Charleston (born 1983), American gridiron football player 
Mary Charleston, Australian choreographer and actress
Oscar Charleston (1896 –1954), American Negro league baseball player
Peter Charleston (born 1930), Australian rules footballer 
Porter Charleston (1904 – 1986), American Negro league player
Reagan Charleston (born 1988), American jewelry designer, lawyer and reality television personality
Red Charleston, American Negro league player
Rondi Charleston, American jazz vocalist and songwriter
Steven Charleston (born 1949), American bishop and academic

See also

 Carlston (name)
Charleson
Charleston (disambiguation)
Charleton (name)
Charlestown (disambiguation)

French-language surnames
German-language surnames